Simon Yihun Stølen Markeng (born 9 September 1992) is a retired Norwegian footballer who played as a forward, notably for Molde in Eliteserien.

Career
Born in Addis Ababa, Ethiopia, Markeng grew up in Molde where he played youth football for SK Træff. In 2009, he was promoted to the first-team squad by head coach Erik Brakstad and made a few appearances for Træff in the 3. divisjon before he moved to Molde FK.

Markeng's debut for Molde was away against Vålerenga on 12 April 2010, when he got to play a few minutes. Three days later, played 45 minutes against Strømsgodset. Markeng spent the 2012 season on loan with Kristiansund, when the team won promotion to the 1. divisjon. Ahead of the 2013 season he made a permanent transfer to Kristiansund, where he received limited playing time in the 1. Divisjon.

Markeng then moved back to his old club Træff ahead of the 2014 season, who now played in the 2. divisjon. Markeng wanted to step down a level to earn more playing time and the head coach Brakstad stated that he thought Markeng would be their top goalscorer that season. After three seasons in Træff, Markeng finished his career with a short spell in Bergen's Ny-Krohnborg IL.

Markeng made one appearance for the Norwegian under-17 team, when he played against Germany U-17 on 10 January 2009.

Career statistics

References

External links

1992 births
Living people
Ethiopian emigrants to Norway
Norwegian footballers
Norway youth international footballers
Molde FK players
Kristiansund BK players
SK Træff players
Eliteserien players
Norwegian First Division players
Association football forwards